Candeias do Jamari is a municipality located in the Brazilian state of Rondônia.

The municipality contains 76% of the fully protected  Samuel Ecological Station.
It also contains part of the  Jacundá National Forest, a sustainable use conservation unit.

References

Municipalities in Rondônia